Musarrat Hilali (born 8 August 1961) is a Pakistani judge. Since March 2013, she has been the only woman on the bench of the Peshawar High Court. She is the third woman to sit on the bench in Khyber-Pakhtunkhwa.

Education 
Hilali received the law degree from the Khyber Law College, Peshawar University.

Career 
She started her career as an advocate of District Courts in 1983. In 1988, she was enrolled as an Advocate of the High Court. She was elevated to the rank of Advocate of Supreme Court in 2006. Hilali was elevated to the bench as Additional Judge in March 2013 and was given the permanent status of the Judge of the Peshawar High Court in 2014.

Career achievements 

 First female elected office bearer on the post of Secretary at the Bar.
 First female elected Vice President at the Bar.
 First female elected General Secretary at the Bar.
 First female elected as Executive Member of the Supreme Court Bar Association. 
 First female Additional Advocate General of Khyber Pakhtunkhwa. 
 First female appointed as Chairperson Khyber Pakhtunkhwa Environmental Protection Tribunal. 
 First female Ombudsman for Protection Against Harassment of Women at Workplace. 
 First woman judge from Khyber Pakhtunkhwa to be elected as an election tribunal for the 2018 Pakistani general elections .

References

1961 births
Living people
Judges of the Peshawar High Court
Pakistani judges